Harm van der Meulen  (21 October 1925, Castricum - 20 October 2007, Utrecht) was a Dutch trade unionist and politician.

See also
List of Dutch politicians

1925 births
2007 deaths
People from Castricum
Christian Democratic Appeal politicians
Dutch trade unionists